Belyayevka may refer to:
Belyayevka, Russia, name of several rural localities in Russia
Biliaivka (Belyayevka), a town in Odessa Oblast, Ukraine